Nesuhi Ertegun (Turkish spelling: Nesuhi Ertegün; November 26, 1917 – July 15, 1989) was a Turkish-American record producer and executive of Atlantic Records and WEA International.

Early life
Born in Istanbul in the Ottoman Empire, Nesuhi and his family, including his younger brother Ahmet, moved to Washington, D.C., in 1935 with their father Munir Ertegun, who was appointed the Turkish Ambassador to the United States that year. 

From an early age, Nesuhi's primary musical interest was jazz. He had attended concerts in Europe before his family moved to the United States.

Career
While living at the Turkish Embassy in Washington, D.C., he promoted jazz concerts during 1941-1944. When his father died in 1944, and the rest of his family returned to Turkey, Nesuhi moved to California, where he married Jazz Man Record Shop owner Marili Morden and helped run the shop as well as establishing the Crescent Records label. After purchasing Jazz Man Records, he discontinued Crescent and issued traditional jazz recordings on Jazz Man until 1952. At Jazz Man, Nesuhi produced classic Kid Ory revival recordings in 1944 and 1945, plus other recordings by Pete Daily and Turk Murphy.

Although his main interest was initially New Orleans jazz, which he also wrote about while serving as the editor of Record Changer magazine, Ertegun was open to more modern styles. He sold the Jazz Man label in 1952 to Lester Koenig and then went to work for Koenig at Good Time Jazz Records. While there, on Koenig's recommendation, he was engaged to teach the first history of jazz course for academic credit at a major US university at UCLA.

In 1955, he was preparing to work for Imperial Records to develop their jazz record line and develop a catalog of LPs. However, Ahmet Ertegun and Jerry Wexler persuaded him instead to join their company, Atlantic Records, where he was made a partner. He became vice-president in charge of the jazz and LP department at Atlantic, building up the label's extensive catalog of jazz LPs. He was responsible for investing in the album market, improving the quality of recordings and sleeve formats.

As a producer at Atlantic he worked with John Coltrane, Charles Mingus, Ornette Coleman, whom Lester Koenig had previously recorded at Contemporary, the Modern Jazz Quartet and many others. Nesuhi also became involved with the label's rhythm & blues and rock-and-roll roster, first recruiting songwriters and producers Leiber and Stoller, with whom he had worked in California, and producing several hit records for Ray Charles, Chris Connor, the Drifters, Bobby Darin and Roberta Flack.

In 1971, Nesuhi founded WEA International, now Warner Music Group. While at WEA International, Nesuhi demonstrated tremendous independence and character, often going against the wishes of his US counterparts. In the 1980s, Nesuhi released the single "Girls, Girls, Girls" by then unknown Latin-American rockers Renegade, demanding a domestic release of their debut album Rock N' Roll Crazy!. The domestic label had demanded the band members change their names to "less ethnic" sounding names. Nesuhi was incensed by the demand, and set out to introduce the record and the act internationally with the band's given names. He remained head of the Warner Records International Division until he retired in 1987.

Death and legacy
With Ahmet, he also co-founded the New York Cosmos soccer team of the North American Soccer League. They were instrumental in bringing in soccer legends like Giorgio Chinaglia, Pelé, Carlos Alberto and Franz Beckenbauer to the club.

Ertegun died on July 15, 1989, at the age of 71, from complications of cancer surgery at Mount Sinai Medical Center in New York City.

Nesuhi Ertegun was inducted posthumously into the Rock & Roll Hall of Fame in 1991. He was posthumously awarded the Grammy Trustees Award for lifetime achievements in 1995. For his contributions to the sport of soccer, he and Ahmet were inducted into the National Soccer Hall of Fame in 2003. The Nesuhi Ertegun Jazz Hall of Fame (now the Ertegun Hall of Fame) at Jazz at Lincoln Center was dedicated to him in 2004.

Nesuhi was an avid collector of Surrealist art. His collection (along with that of his friend Daniel Filipacchi) was exhibited at the Guggenheim in New York in 1999 in "Surrealism: Two Private Eyes, the Nesuhi Ertegun and Daniel Filipacchi Collections"—an event described by The New York Times as "a gourmet banquet", large enough to "pack the Solomon R. Guggenheim Museum from ceiling to lobby with a powerful exhibition".

See also
 Turkish diaspora

Notes

References

Sources

 Rock and Roll Hall of Fame - Biography of Nesuhi Ertegun
 Guggenheim Museum Publications (1999). Surrealism: Two Private Eyes, the Nesuhi Ertegun and Daniel Filipacchi Collections. The Solomon R. Guggenheim Foundation, New York.

External links

 The New York Times review of the exhibit "Surrealism: Two Private Eyes, the Nesuhi Ertegun and Daniel Filipacchi Collections."

American music industry executives
National Soccer Hall of Fame members
Turkish football chairmen and investors
American soccer chairmen and investors
North American Soccer League (1968–1984) executives
Businesspeople from Istanbul
Turkish emigrants to the United States
1917 births
1989 deaths
Jazz record producers
20th-century American businesspeople